Robert Beattie (24 January 1916 – 21 September 2002) was a Scottish footballer, who played for Kilwinning Rangers, Kilmarnock, Preston North End and Wigan Athletic. He made one appearance for Scotland in 1938.

Beattie started his senior career with Kilmarnock and scored 43 goals in 120 Scottish Football League appearances for the club. He was sold to Preston North End in October 1937 for £2,500. He joined a club which already had several Scottish players, including Andy Beattie and Bill Shankly. During his first season with the club, Beattie was part of the team that won the 1938 FA Cup Final. Competitive football stopped due to the Second World War, but Beattie continued to play for Preston when the Football League resumed in 1946–47 and did not leave the club until 1953. He made a total of 264 appearances in the Football League, scoring 49 goals. He finished his career with Wigan Athletic, appearing 19 times in the Lancashire Combination and scoring five times.

References

1916 births
2002 deaths
Footballers from North Ayrshire
Scottish footballers
Association football inside forwards
Kilwinning Rangers F.C. players
Kilmarnock F.C. players
Preston North End F.C. players
Wigan Athletic F.C. players
Scottish Football League players
English Football League players
Scotland international footballers
Scottish Junior Football Association players
Scotland junior international footballers
FA Cup Final players
People from Stevenston